Bryja – thin kasza or mash, a Germanic, Celtic and Slavic dish, based on overcooked oat or kasza, that formulated the basis of their respectable cuisine. It is also the name of a traditional Silesian dish served during Wigilia. The dish's names: bryja, breja, brejka, breha, the German Brei have their roots in Celtic languages.

Variations
While a primarily savoury dish, the bryja base can also produce different types of sweets, including the poppy seed-based kutia, as well as the traditional Silesian dish with the same name, made from plums, apples, pears, with the addition of śmietana, wheat flour, cinnamon, sugar and salt.

See also
Polish cuisine
Silesian cuisine

References

Polish cuisine
Silesian cuisine